Iverson Creek is a creek in northern British Columbia, Canada. It flows northeast into Toozaza Creek.

References

External links
 

Rivers of British Columbia
Cassiar Land District